Evaristo Marc Chengula (1 January 1941 – 21 November 2018) was a Tanzanian Roman Catholic bishop from the congregation of the Consolata Missionaries.

Biography 
Chengula was born in Tanzania and was ordained to the priesthood in 1970. He served as bishop of the Roman Catholic Diocese of Mbeya from 1997 until his death in 2018.

Notes

1941 births
2018 deaths
21st-century Roman Catholic bishops in Tanzania
20th-century Roman Catholic bishops in Tanzania
Roman Catholic bishops of Mbeya